Romário Manuel Silva Baró (born 25 January 2000) is a professional footballer who plays for Primeira Liga club Casa Pia on loan from Porto as a midfielder. Born in Guinea-Bissau, Baró represents Portugal internationally at youth level.

Club career
Born in Bissau in Guinea-Bissau, Baró played in Sporting CP's youth teams before joining FC Porto in 2014. He made his professional debut for the reserves in LigaPro on 21 January 2018, playing the last three minutes of a 1–1 home draw against F.C. Arouca as a substitute for Rui Moreira. He made ten appearances over the season and scored once, to open a 3–0 win over S.C. Covilhã on 18 March, also at the Estádio Dr. Jorge Sampaio.

In the 2018–19 UEFA Youth League, Baró scored six goals in ten appearances as Porto won the title. In the final, he assisted Afonso Sousa for the last goal of a 3–1 win over Chelsea in Nyon, Switzerland. With the B-team in the second division, he scored four goals in 28 games over the season, and was sent off for dissent on 1 September 2018 in a 2–1 home win over Académico de Viseu FC.

Baró was given the first team's number 8 shirt ahead of the 2019–20 season, inheriting it from Yacine Brahimi. He made his debut in the UEFA Champions League third qualifying round first leg on 7 August, starting in a 1–0 win away to FC Krasnodar and making way for Luis Díaz on 55 minutes. Ten days later he played his first game in the Primeira Liga, again starting a 4–0 home win against Vitória FC.

On 1 September 2021, he joined Estoril in the Primeira Liga on loan.

International career
Baró has represented Portugal at various youth levels. At the 2021 UEFA European Under-21 Championship, where Portugal finished as runners-up to Germany, he appeared in quarterfinal and semifinal games.

Career statistics

Honours
Porto Youth
UEFA Youth League: 2018–19

Porto
Primeira Liga: 2019–20
Taça de Portugal: 2019–20
Supertaça Cândido de Oliveira: 2020

References

External links

2000 births
Living people
Sportspeople from Bissau
Portuguese footballers
Portugal youth international footballers
Portugal under-21 international footballers
Bissau-Guinean emigrants to Portugal
Association football midfielders
Primeira Liga players
Liga Portugal 2 players
FC Porto B players
FC Porto players
G.D. Estoril Praia players
Casa Pia A.C. players